German submarine U-66 was a Type IXC U-boat of Nazi Germany's Kriegsmarine during World War II. The submarine was laid down on 20 March 1940 at the AG Weser yard at Bremen, launched on 10 October and commissioned on 2 January 1941 under the command of Kapitänleutnant Richard Zapp as part of the 2nd U-boat Flotilla.

Design
German Type IXC submarines were slightly larger than the original Type IXBs. U-66 had a displacement of  when at the surface and  while submerged. She had two shafts and two  propellers.

U-66 was fitted with six  torpedo tubes (four fitted at the bow and two at the stern), 22 torpedoes, one  SK C/32 naval gun, 180 rounds, and a  SK C/30 as well as a  C/30 anti-aircraft gun. The boat had a complement of forty-eight.

Service history
She was a member of four wolfpacks.

U-66 was the seventh most successful U-boat in World War II.

On 6 May 1944, during her ninth patrol, she was sunk west of the Cape Verde Islands by depth charges, ramming and gunfire from Grumman TBF Avenger and Grumman F4F Wildcat aircraft of the US escort carrier  and by the destroyer escort .

Patrols

First
On 13 May 1940, three days after the start of the invasion of France, U-66 departed her homeport of Kiel under the command of Richard Zapp, a future Knight's Cross recipient, on her first patrol. After about 10 days she rounded the northern coast of Britain and made her way into the mid-Atlantic Ocean. After another 20 days, U-66 headed for her new base at Lorient, on the French Atlantic coast (one of the first to do so) and where the U-boat was based for the rest of her career.

Second
After refitting and refueling, U-66 set off to the Cape Verde islands. Following an uneventful six-day voyage, she came upon convoy SL-78, a convoy designated to give supplies to Allied African countries. She extended her tonnage sunk with the torpedoing of Saint Anselm on the next day, which was a British steam merchant ship of 5,614 GRT. More than two weeks later, she sank Holmside, a 3,433 GRT straggler from the convoy OG-67 northeast of the Cape Verde Islands. The remainder of the patrol was unsuccessful; she returned to Lorient in about a month.

Third
On 28 August, U-66 left Lorient for north-eastern South America. The patrol was mostly uneventful, but the boat found the Panamanian steam tanker I.C. White, off the eastern coast of Brazil on 24 September. After a two-day chase, U-66 hit the tanker with one torpedo. U-66 continued the remainder of the patrol without any further incident and returned to Lorient on 9 November.

Fourth
U-66s fourth sortie was part of Operation Drumbeat, a German attempt to hinder American convoys off the east coast of the United States. U-66, leaving on 25 December 1941 and in compliance with orders, positioned herself off Cape Hatteras on 15 January 1942 and started to hunt for a target. The next day she sank a  Canadian passenger liner, with two stern-launched torpedoes, killing 246 passengers and crew. Three days later with two stern-launched torpedoes she hit Olympic, a  Panamanian steam tanker which broke in two after one minute. Two days after that, Empire Gem and Venore (an  British motor tanker and an  American steam merchant ship, the latter following the former), were both sunk by U-66. Empire Gem was hit amidships and aft by two torpedoes, while Venore, 20 miles behind, had only one torpedo hit that set her boilers on fire. U-66 then continued eastward back to Lorient, where she arrived on 10 February.

Fifth
On 21 March, U-66 left for what proved to be her most successful patrol, resulting in 43,956 gross metric tons sunk and 12,502 gross metric tons damaged in the Caribbean Sea. 24 days after departure she sank Korthion, a  Greek steam merchantman just south of Barbados with one torpedo hit amidships. Two days later, the boat sank Amsterdam, a  Dutch steam tanker, which split in two after being hit by two torpedoes, one amidships, and one in the engine room. Most of the survivors were picked up near Port of Spain, (Trinidad) by Ivan, a Yugoslavian steam merchant vessel. The next day U-66 attacked Heinrich von Riedemann, an 11,020 GRT Panamanian motor tanker. The first torpedo severely damaged the steering control of her port engine and ruptured a tank of oil, making much of it leak out. 20 minutes after the first hit, just after the starboard engine was stopped, the ship was abandoned when the crew took to the lifeboats. An hour later U-66 hit her with a second torpedo, setting her afire. It extinguished itself within 25 minutes. 50 minutes later the submarine hit her with a third torpedo, which set the ship afire again. She remained that way for about 70 minutes before she finally sank. Nine days later U-66 sank the  US Alcoa Partner with a torpedo and a shot from her deck gun.

Sixth
After her fifth patrol, Richard Zapp left U-66 to take command of the 3rd U-boat Flotilla. This meant that Kapitänleutnant Friedrich Markworth was in charge. The submarine started her sixth patrol with the sinking of Triglav, a  Yugoslavian steamer, after depositing a sick crew-member in Spain. After a couple of weeks, U-66 ran across the 4,942 GRT Brazilian merchant ship Tamandaré, sinking her with a torpedo hit in her stern. Two days after the attack on Tamandaré, U-66 sank Weirbank, a  British merchantman on 28 July 1942, with the second of two torpedoes launched at her. Four days after her previous sinking, two mines from U-66 severely damaged two British motor torpedo boats that had left on a patrol from Port Castries, St. Lucia. Those two mines had been laid, along with four others, on 20 July. U-66 subsequently sank the 766 GRT Polish Rozewie on 6 August and the American  Topa Topa on the 29th. The next day she sank both the  Panamanian Sir Huon and the  American West Lashaway in separate attacks. Deciding that the raft could be a disguised U-boat, Vimy opened fire, luckily with no result. The raft's sail was hastily cut down, upon which the British destroyer rescued 17 people.

U-66 also sank the  Winamac on 31 August and the Swedish  Peiping on 9 September. She returned to Lorient on 29 September.

Seventh (aborted)
On 9 November 1942, U-66 left Lorient on what should have been her seventh war patrol. Soon after departure, leaks were encountered, and she decided to return. On 10 November, the day before she returned, a British Wellington bomber, equipped with a Leigh Light, spotted her and dropped four depth charges. The U-boat escaped without serious damage.

Seventh
U-66 left Lorient on 6 January 1943 for what was officially her seventh patrol. On 20 January, the ship landed an espionage agent on the coast of Mauritania, but the agent and two crewmen were immediately captured. Her first sinking came with the attack on the 113 GRT French Joseph Elise on 1 February. On the 27th, U-66 attacked the 4,312 GRT British coal merchant ship St. Margaret in mid-Atlantic near Bermuda, sinking her with one torpedo and, after several misses, a shell. Several survivors were captured and taken to the prison camp Marlag und Milag Nord. U-66 then returned to port, arriving on 24 March 1943.

Eighth
U-66s eighth patrol started after a quick refit on 7 April 1943 when she left Lorient. At 148 days, it was to be her longest. She first sank the 10,173 GRT American Esso Gettysburg, which was carrying crude oil, on 10 June after unsuccessfully attempting to attack several other American tankers. On 2 July, she successfully sank the 10,195 GRT Bloody Marsh (this ship was on her maiden voyage), with a torpedo. The last ship encountered on the patrol was the 10,172 GRT Cherry Valley, also American, which she sank on 22 July. U-66 then returned to Lorient.

Ninth
On 16 January 1944, U-66 left Lorient for what would be her last patrol and the last command of Oberleutnant zur See Gerhard Seehausen (posthumously promoted to Kapitänleutnant). A month and ten days after departure, U-66 sighted Silvermaple, a 5,313 GRT British motor merchant in the convoy ST-12. She was sunk after one torpedo hit. Four days later, the boat came upon the French 5,202 GRT St. Louis, which she sank with two torpedoes off Accra, Ghana. The ship broke into three parts, which sank in less than 50 seconds. Four days after the sinking of St. Louis, on 5 March 1944 'U-66 sank the 4,964 GRT British John Holt with two torpedoes, and took the captain, Master Cecil Gordon Hime, and a passenger, Mr Elliott - an agent of the Holt Shipping Company, prisoner. These men were later lost with the U-boat. Nearly three weeks after the sinking of John Holt, the U-boat came across the 4,257 GRT British Matadian, which she torpedoed and sank. After the attack, U-66 was forced to bottom out in the mud as British patrol craft engaged her.

Sinking

Three Fido homing torpedoes were dropped near the boat, and numerous aircraft from Block Island, along with smaller craft, were designated to hunt for her. On the morning of 6 May, the destroyer escort  found the submarine. After an exchange of gunfire and torpedoes, Buckley, under the command of Lieutenant Commander Brent Abel, rammed the submarine.

With the two vessels stuck fast, a party of Germans, under the command of U-66s first officer, Klaus Herbig, attempted to climb onto the American escort's forecastle to create a diversion while Seehausen and the remainder of the U-boat's crew worked to free the boat. As American sailors saw the boarding party climbing on deck, hand-to-hand fighting broke out in which a number of Germans were killed or wounded before the U-boat was able to make good its escape. Five armed Germans remained on deck of the destroyer but they were quickly overpowered and taken prisoner. Buckleys 3-inch gun was unleashed on the U-boat as the Americans chased after her, but U-66 then turned and rammed Buckley near her engine room, damaging the ship's starboard screw. Soon afterward, U-66 was scuttled on Seehausen's orders to prevent her secret equipment from being captured. Buckley then began rescue operations, which lasted three hours.

U-66 was lost at position  with 24 dead and 36 survivors, all of whom were captured by Buckley. Seehausen was not among the survivors, who were later transferred to Block Island. For his act of ramming U-66, Brent Abel received the Navy Cross.

Wolfpacks
U-66 took part in four wolfpacks, namely:
 West (24 May – 5 June 1941) 
 Rochen (27 January – 1 March 1943) 
 Tümmler (1 – 17 March 1943) 
 Aufnahme (5 – 10 May 1943)

Summary of raiding history

See also
 List of successful U-boats
 The Enemy Below

References

Notes

Citations

Bibliography

External links

 uboataces.com webpage with insignia for U-66
 YouTube video:  USS Buckley vs U-66 during the Battle of the Atlantic

 1944: May 6: Sinking of U-66 - National Museum of Naval History

German Type IX submarines
U-boats commissioned in 1941
Maritime incidents in May 1944
U-boats sunk in 1944
U-boats sunk by US warships
U-boats sunk by US aircraft
World War II submarines of Germany
World War II shipwrecks in the Atlantic Ocean
1940 ships
Ships built in Bremen (state)